Gustavo Pittaluga González del Campillo (Madrid, 1906 - Madrid, 1975) was a Spanish composer and member of the Grupo de los Ocho.

References

1906 births
1975 deaths
Spanish composers
Spanish male composers
20th-century composers
20th-century Spanish musicians
20th-century Spanish male musicians